John Chalkley Buchanan (January 20, 1911 – April 15, 1991) was an American physician and politician who served in the Virginia Senate from his election in 1971 up to his death from cancer 20 years later. He chaired the Senate's General Laws committee.

References

External links 
 
 

1911 births
1991 deaths
Democratic Party Virginia state senators
20th-century American politicians